Chiang Chung "CC" Mei (born 4 April 1935) is Ford Professor of Engineering, Emeritus, at the Department of Civil and Environmental Engineering of Massachusetts Institute of Technology, known for his contributions in fluid mechanics with applications to civil, environmental, and coastal engineering.

He has been an Associate Editor of the Journal of Fluid Mechanics. He received the Moffatt–Nichol Award in 1992 and the International Coastal Engineering Award in 1995, both from the American Society of Civil Engineers. He was awarded the Theodore von Karman Medal in 2007.

The 24th International Workshop on Water Waves and Floating Bodies of 2009 is dedicated to Mei on the occasion of his retirement. In the same year, the "C.C. Mei Symposium on Wave Mechanics and Hydrodynamics" was organised at the International Conference on Ocean, Offshore and Arctic Engineering (OMAE).

Education
Mei received his B.S. (1955) from National Taiwan University, M.S. (1958) from Stanford University, and PhD (1963) from California Institute of Technology.

Personal
Mei is married to Carol.

Books

References

External links 

1935 births
Living people
American people of Taiwanese descent
MIT School of Engineering faculty
Fluid dynamicists
National Taiwan University alumni
Stanford University alumni
California Institute of Technology alumni
Members of the United States National Academy of Engineering
American people of Chinese descent